The 2022 Conference USA baseball tournament was held from May 25 through 29 at Pete Taylor Park in Hattiesburg, Mississippi. The annual tournament determined the tournament champion of Division I Conference USA in college baseball. The tournament champion, Louisiana Tech, then earned the conference's automatic bid to the 2022 NCAA Division I baseball tournament.

The tournament has been held every year since 1996, except for 2020, due to the COVID-19 pandemic. The Rice Owls has claimed seven championships, the most of any school, with the Owls latest win in 2017.

Format and seeding
The tournament consisted of the top eight teams in regular season play. The format consisted of two double-elimination brackets, with a single-elimination championship game.

Bracket and results

Schedule

Conference championship

All–Tournament Team

References

2022 Conference USA baseball season
Conference USA Baseball Tournament
Conference USA baseball tournament
Conference USA baseball tournament
College sports tournaments in Mississippi
Baseball competitions in Mississippi
Hattiesburg, Mississippi